Landmark was a massively multiplayer online role-playing game developed and published by Daybreak Game Company (originally Sony Online Entertainment) for Microsoft Windows. The game's original name was EverQuest Next Landmark, but was switched to Landmark in March 2014. The original purpose for EverQuest Next Landmark was mainly as a player content creation tool for EverQuest Next. Landmark was released in June 2016, and was playable until the servers were shut down in February 2017.

Development 
The original purpose for EverQuest Next Landmark was mainly as a player content creation tool for EverQuest Next.  In April 2014, Dave Georgeson, director of development on the EverQuest series, told Polygon in the interview that "Sony Online [Daybreak] won't ever be finished making Landmark". On February 2, 2015, Sony sold Sony Online Entertainment to the investment company Columbus Nova, who renamed it Daybreak Game Company. In June 2015, it was announced that Daybreak Game Company shifted its focus of development from Landmark to EverQuest Next, meaning that "any features that are Landmark-only are lower in priority and will have to wait until we have time to come back to them."

On March 11, 2016, Daybreak Game Company president Russell Shanks announced that EverQuest Next had been cancelled. Also an announcement on official Landmark forums was made by an executive producer of EverQuest and EverQuest II that Landmark would be launching in 2016. On January 5, 2017, only seven months after its release, Daybreak announced they would be shutting down the game's servers, as well as the accompanying forums and social media channels, on February 21, 2017.

References

External links
 

2016 video games
Products and services discontinued in 2017
Massively multiplayer online role-playing games
Video games scored by Jeremy Soule
Video games developed in the United States
Windows games
Windows-only games
Inactive massively multiplayer online games